Hosni Obaid Khadoom Al-Busaidi (born 5 June 1993), commonly known as Hosni Al-Busaidi, is an Omani footballer who plays for Al-Seeb Club in Oman Professional League.

International career
Hosni was selected for the national team for the first time in 2012. He made his first appearance for Oman on 8 December 2012 against Lebanon in the 2012 WAFF Championship. He has made an appearance in the 2012 WAFF Championship and has represented the national team in the 2014 FIFA World Cup qualification.

Honours

Club
Al-Seeb
Oman Professional League Cup
Runners-up (1): 2013

References

External links
 
 
 
 

1993 births
Living people
People from Seeb
Omani footballers
Oman international footballers
Association football defenders
Al-Seeb Club players
Oman Professional League players